"Mi Amor Por Ti" (My Love for You) is a single by Salvadoran singer Álvaro Torres and Mexican singer Marisela, released on 1985 through Fonovisa Records as part of Torres' seventh studio album Tres. The song was written by Torres, produced by Enrique Elizondo and it was recorded in George Tobin Studios, North Hollywood, CA. "Mi Amor Por Ti" was a popular hit throughout Latin America, becoming the biggest hit of its album.

Track listing

Personnel 
Credits adapted from Tres and "Mi Amor Por Ti" liner notes.

Vocals

 Álvaro Torres – lead vocals
 Marisela – lead vocals

Musicians

 David White – arrangements

Production

 Enrique Elizondo – production
 Alan Hirshberg  – engineering

Recording

 Recorded at George Tobin Studios, North Hollywood, CA

References

External links
 Lyrics of this song at Musixmatch

1985 singles
Álvaro Torres songs
Marisela songs